Knowsley Road in Eccleston, St Helens, Merseyside, was the home ground of St. Helens from 1890 until its closure in 2010. St Helens Town FC played their home fixtures at Knowsley Road from 2002 until 2010. For a period, the venue also hosted Liverpool F.C. Reserves. The stadium was demolished during spring 2011 and a new construction then known as Cunningham Grange, named after club legend Keiron Cunningham, was built on the site.

Stadium
Knowsley Road consisted of four stands of open terracing and one seated stand called the Family Stand.

Family Stand

The Family Stand was the only section of the stadium which had a seated area, although there were still areas for standing supporters. The players entered the field from a gateway under the stand and the dugout was also in the Family Stand. The Family Stand contained an area for the media such as local radio stations. It was built after the Second World War, funded by local businesses. The actual design of the stand means that it only ran for two-thirds of that side of the pitch.

When the Main Stand was built, it provided a new changing room facility and gymnasium for the players, replacing the smaller, outdated ones at the old Pavilion End of the ground, next to the scoreboard. Players would come out of the new tunnel before kick off to a centralised view of the stadium, facing the Popular Stand.

When the Main Stand was constructed, it created an overhang at the top of the stand. This was because the old Eccleston railway ran below the site of the new stand, linking the Triplex (Pilkington) factory to the town centre. The railway has long gone now, and was replaced by the club's car park.

Popular Stand

The Popular Stand was an all standing section of the ground and was the most popular stand for home supporters. The stand was built in the 1960s at a cost of over £30,000. It spread across the full length of the pitch. It held the Scaff – the gantry in which the press gathered. When St Helens were on television, the Popular Stand regularly were heard singing and chanting due to the small distance between the cameras and the supporters.

Dunriding Lane End

The Dunriding Lane End was the only stand without a roof. It contained nine corporate boxes, as well as the stadium restaurant and the official store. Prior to being moved to the Family Stand, the changing rooms were at the Dunriding Lane End and players would enter from a tunnel.

The Dunriding Lane End of the ground was known as the Boys' Pen – a spot where die-hard fans congregated during the post-war years. During the 1970s, and 1980s, the club became aware of the need for corporate facilities in line with other clubs and the decision was made to build a bar, restaurant and executive boxes for the fans, and to give them a new and luxurious match day experience.

Eddington End

The Eddington End was a typical Kop. It was the second biggest stand overall at the ground, and the tallest, with the best views of the pitch. In the 1960s, a roof was placed on the Eddington End of the ground. The Eddington End is generally an away end, where most away fans congregated on match days. It became a haunt for local derby chanting with fans of arch rivals Wigan.

History 

St. Helens moved to Knowsley Road in 1890, defeating Manchester Rangers in their first match. The stadium pre-dated the birth of the Northern Rugby Football Union (which would later become rugby league) by five years. Having been formed in 1873, St. Helens were a rugby union club when they moved into Knowsley Road. The stadium changed in appearance very little in its 120 years.

Lord Derby open the new pavilion on 26 December 1920 at a match against Wigan. A ground record of 35,695 fans turned up to watch Saints play Wigan on Boxing Day 1949. In January 1950, the training pitch was laid down. In February 1951, the newly completed Eccleston Kop covered enclosure was opened and was named after Supporters' Club Secretary George Eddington. In August 1958, the club's new grandstand was opened by Sir Harry Pilkington. The structure cost £32,000 and could seat 2,400.

In September 1961, new metal goal posts replaced the wooden originals after storm damage. The new popular side enclosure was erected in 1962. The old wooden structure that it replaced was given to Liverpool City for their ground at Knotty Ash. Saints' new floodlighting system opened by Sir Harry Pilkington on 27 January 1965. The bar and restaurant complex was opened at Dunriding Lane End of the Knowsley Road stadium in 1973.

Players' dug outs were moved from the Main Stand to the Popular Side in 1983. In September 1989, work started on nine executive boxes and an electronic scoreboard at the Dunriding Lane End.

In 2006, Knowsley Road was renovated slightly. On the club's new sponsorship deal with Earth Money, the stadium got new signs, new dug outs were installed, as were the toilet facilities which had been long complained about by supporters.

In 2006, Knowsley Road was approved as an international Test venue after safety and capacity improvements. It subsequently hosted an international test fixture in 2006 between Great Britain and New Zealand, which Great Britain won.

In June 2007, club chairman Eamonn McManus announced plans for a new 18,000 capacity stadium, with a Tesco store and plaza with 2,000 car parking spaces for the 2011 Super League Season. These plans were approved by local councillors in May 2008. Plans were put on hold and building work did not start on time. Knowsley Road was closed at the end of the 2010 Super League Season and St Helens played their home games at Widnes' Stobart Stadium for the 2011 Super League Season.

The last first team match at Knowsley Road was the St. Helens vs Huddersfield game, a play-off semi-final on 24 September 2010. St. Helens won 42–22, the final try on the ground being scored by retiring club captain Keiron Cunningham.

Stadium records

Rugby League Test matches
List of rugby league test matches played at Knowsley Road.

Rugby League Tour Matches
Other than St Helens club games, Knowsley Road also saw St Helens, a combined St Helens – St Helens Recs XIII, the county team Lancashire and an English League XIII play host to international touring teams from Australia (sometimes playing as Australasia), New Zealand and France from 1907–2002.

See also 
 English rugby league stadia by capacity
 Development of stadiums in English football

References

External links 

 St Helens website
 New St Helens stadium site
 Jon Wilkin column: On Knowsley Road and the new stadium

Buildings and structures in St Helens, Merseyside
St Helens R.F.C.
Defunct rugby league venues in England
Rugby League World Cup stadiums
Defunct sports venues in Merseyside